Goring-on-Thames (or Goring) is a village and civil parish on the River Thames in South Oxfordshire, England, about  south of Wallingford and  northwest of Reading. It had a population of 3,187 in the 2011 census, put at 3,335 in 2019. Goring & Streatley railway station is on the main Oxford–London line. Most land is farmland, with woodland on the Goring Gap outcrop of the Chiltern Hills. Its riverside plain encloses the residential area, including a high street with shops, pubs and restaurants. Nearby are the village churches – one dedicated to St Thomas Becket has a nave built within 50 years of the saint's death, in the early 13th century, along with a later bell tower. Goring faces the smaller Streatley across the Thames. The two are linked by Goring and Streatley Bridge.

Geography
Across the river is the Berkshire village of Streatley, often seen as a twin village. They are linked by Goring and Streatley Bridge and its adjacent lock and weir. The Thames Path, Icknield Way and the Ridgeway cross the Thames at Goring. The Great Western Main Line serves Goring & Streatley railway station with Great Western Railway trains between London Paddington, Reading and Didcot.

Early history
The name Goring first appears in the Domesday Book of 1086 as Garinges, then as Garingies in a charter once held in the British Museum. It translates as "Gara's people".

Religious sites
The Church of England parish church of St Thomas of Canterbury displays Norman architecture of the early 12th century, with the bell-stage of a bell tower added in the 15th century. This has a ring of eight bells, one dating from 1290. The wood for the rood screen was taken from HMS Thunderer (1783), one of Nelson's fleet at Trafalgar. A church hall was added in 1901.

The Anglican Churches of Goring, Streatley and South Stoke form a united benefice. A priory of Augustinian nuns was built late in the 12th century with its own priory church adjoining St Thomas's. This survived until demolished with the early 16th-century Dissolution of the Monasteries. The foundations of the priory church, cloister, dormitory, vestry, chapter house and parlour were excavated in 1892. 

Goring Free Church belongs to the Countess of Huntingdon's Connexion. The congregation was founded in 1788 and its first chapel built in 1793. At its centenary in 1893, a new church building was added and the original chapel converted into a church hall. It holds two Sunday services. The Catholic Church of Our Lady and St John the Apostle was designed by the architect William Ravenscroft and built in 1898. It now forms a single parish with the Roman Catholic Church of Christ the King in Woodcote.

Amenities
Goring United Football Club plays in the Reading Football League. Goring-on-Thames Cricket Club, founded in 1876, has two teams in the Berkshire Cricket League. Goring has a lawn tennis club with teams that play in two local leagues. Goring and Streatley Golf Club is located in adjoining Streatley. Goring on Thames Decorative and Fine Arts Society, founded in 1987, belongs to the National Association of Decorative and Fine Arts Societies. Goring has a Women's Institute. The local bus service between Goring and Wallingford is run by the Goring-based community interest company Going Forward Buses, established in December 2016.

Awards

Oxfordshire Village of the Year 2009
On 10 July 2009, Goring was named Oxfordshire's Village of the Year, ahead of 11 other villages and succeeding Woodcote. The £1000 prize was put towards the village's hydro-electric project to generate electricity from the River Thames. The competition considered the depth of infrastructure and activity in the village and at Goring's £1 million hydro-electric plans.

Calor success
Goring-on-Thames was the winner in the Sustainability and Communications category and the Overall Regional Winner of the 2011 Calor Village of the Year regional heat for South England.

Britain in Bloom
Goring was a finalist in the small towns category of the Britain in Bloom contest in 2019.

Notable residents
In the summer of 1893, Oscar Wilde stayed at Ferry House in Goring with Lord Alfred Douglas. While there, Wilde began writing his play An Ideal Husband, which includes a main character named Lord Goring.

An enlarged Ferry Cottage became the retirement home of Sir Arthur Harris, wartime leader of RAF Bomber Command, from 1953 until his death in 1984. He was buried in Burntwood Cemetery in Goring.

The singer George Michael lived at Mill Cottage close to the river in his later years. He was found dead there at the age of 53 in the early hours of 25 December 2016.

In order of birth:
Sir John Soane (1753–1837), architect, was born in Goring.
Thomas Rome (1838–1916), Australian politician, died in Goring.
Digby Willoughby (1845–1901), military mercenary, died in Goring.
Aubrey Strahan (1852–1928), geologist, retired to Goring.
Noel Denholm Davis (1876–1950), portrait painter, died in Goring.
Thomas Miller (1883–1962), first-class cricketer, died in Goring.
C. H. Dodd (1884–1973), theologian who directed the translation of the New English Bible, died in Goring.
Henry Harwood (1888–1950), World War II admiral
Sir Arthur Harris, 1st Baronet (1892–1984), World War II RAF air marshal
William Allmond Codrington Goode (1907–1986), first head of state of Singapore, died in Goring.
Ken Walker (1922–1989), first-class cricketer, died in Goring.
Anton Rogers (1933–2007), actor
Sir John Thomson (1941–1994), RAF Air Chief Marshal
Jon Lord (1941–2012), composer, pianist and rock/classical pioneer, lived in Goring in later life.
Pete Townshend (born 1945), musician (The Who)
Pete de Freitas (1961-1989), musician (Echo & the Bunnymen), ashes buried in Goring.
George Michael (1963–2016), musician, vocalist and producer

Freedom of the parish
The privilege of Freedom of the Parish of Goring on Thames has been awarded to:
Stephanie Bridle, 16 October 2017, for work as a parish councillor
Janet Hurst: 12 April 2020, for work on the Britain in Bloom competition and Goring Gap Local History Society

Nearby places

Twin towns
Bellême  since 1979
Stühlingen

References

Sources

External links

Community of Goring and Streatley - local news and events website
Going Forward Buses CIC
Goring and District Twinning Association 
Goring and Streatley Amenity Association
Goring Civil Parish Council - about Goring-on-Thames
Goring Gap News

Villages in Oxfordshire
Populated places on the River Thames
Civil parishes in Oxfordshire
South Oxfordshire District